Elmer Joseph "Lefty" Miller (April 17, 1903 – January 8, 1987) was an American professional baseball player. Although he was best known as a pinch hitter, he appeared in eight games as a pitcher and four games as a right fielder.

Miller was born in Detroit, Michigan and died in Corona, California.

References

Major League Baseball pitchers
Major League Baseball right fielders
Philadelphia Phillies players
Baseball players from Detroit
1903 births
1987 deaths